Central Wisconsin Airport , referred to as "C-Way", is a public airport located  southeast of the central business district of Mosinee, in Marathon County, Wisconsin, United States. It is owned by Marathon County and Portage County. It is included in the Federal Aviation Administration (FAA) National Plan of Integrated Airport Systems for 2023–2027, in which it is categorized as a non-hub primary commercial service facility. It is the fifth busiest of eight commercial airports in Wisconsin in terms of passengers served.

The airport serves a large swath of Central and North Central Wisconsin including cities such as Marshfield, Stevens Point, Wausau and Wisconsin Rapids, as well as several tourism communities.

Facilities and aircraft

It contains two concrete paved runways: 8/26 measuring 7,648 x 150 ft (2,331 x 46 m) and 17/35 measuring 6,501 x 150 ft (1,982 x 46 m). For the 12-month period ending December 31, 2022, the airport had 13,592 operations, an average of 37 aircraft operations per day: 56% scheduled commercial / air taxi, 43% general aviation and almost 1% military. In February 2023, there were 24 aircraft based at this airport: 16 single-engine, 3 multi-engine, 3 jet, 1 helicopter and 1 glider aircraft. 

CWA has T-hangars for lease, or an individual or corporation can construct their own hangar.

The airport is home to a maintenance base for Endeavor Air which operates on behalf of Delta Air Lines as Delta Connection.

History
Central Wisconsin Airport opened in 1969 as a centralized commercial airport between Wausau and Stevens Point which each had their own commercial airfields prior to that time. North Central Airlines served the new airport with flights to Chicago, Milwaukee, and Minneapolis/St. Paul, some flights making stops at other cities within Wisconsin. North Central previously served Wausau and Stevens Point individually and was able to upgrade their service from prop aircraft to Douglas DC-9 jets with the opening of CWA. North Central merged with two other airlines to become Republic Airlines in 1979 which was then merged into Northwest Airlines in 1986. Northwest merged into Delta Air Lines in 2010 which continues to serve CWA by way of feeder carriers operating as Delta Connection. After airline deregulation was passed in 1978, several other carriers including Skyway Airlines, operating on behalf of Midwest Express, have served CWA. American Airlines and United Airlines also began new service to Chicago by way of their feeder carriers operating as American Eagle and United Express. American Eagle and Delta Connection continue to serve the airport.  

In 1997, the terminal was modernized with five new gates, and the highway access was reconstructed. 

On September 1, 2012, the airport began a $10 million modernization program, moving the security checkpoints and enlarging the ticket counters to lower passenger congestion.  The airport gained a geothermal energy system that reduces utility bills, providing all but 20% of its heating and cooling requirements.

Airlines and destinations

Passenger

Statistics

Cargo operations

See also

 List of airports in Wisconsin
 List of intercity bus stops in Wisconsin
 Metro Ride

References

External links

Central Wisconsin Airport, official site
  page from the Wisconsin DOT Airport Directory

Airports in Wisconsin
Buildings and structures in Marathon County, Wisconsin